A medical triad is a group of three signs or symptoms, the result of injury to three organs, which characterise a specific medical condition. The appearance of all three signs conjoined together in another patient, points to that the patient has the same medical condition, or diagnosis. A medical tetrad is a group of four, while a pentad is a group of five.

Triads

Tetrads

Pentads

See also
 Medical eponyms
 Pathognomonic
 List of eponymously named medical signs

References

Medical triads and pentads
Medical triads
Medical pentads